The Cijin–Gushan ferry connects the Cijin and Gushan Districts of Kaohsiung, Taiwan. It is popular with tourists visiting the attractions of Cijin Island.

A ride on the ferry costed around NT$0.2 in the 1970s but the route has been operating since the Ming Dynasty. It currently costs NT$30 per one-way ride. The journey takes about five minutes from Gushan to Cijin, an island which has seafood restaurants, traditional markets and a beach for tourists.

See also
 Transportation in Taiwan

References

Transportation in Kaohsiung
Ferries of Taiwan
Gushan District